Wioletta Grzegorzewska, or Wioletta Greg (1974) is a Polish poet and writer nominated for The Man Booker Prize.

Life
Wioletta born in a small village Rzeniszów in Jurassic Highland in Poland. In 2006, she left her country and moved to the Isle of Wight. She spent there ten years in Ryde. She lives now in Lewes.

Works

Between 1998 – 2012 she published several poetry volumes, novels as well as a novella Swallowing Mercury, in which she's covering her childhood and the experience of growing up in Communist Poland. 
Senior editor Max Porter from Portobello Books said:
Swallowing Mercury is an enchanting and intriguing book. Wioletta Greg is a poet and every line of this haunting autobiographical novella has its own weird, beautiful atmosphere. It reminded me of Evie Wyld, Ludmila Petrushevskaya and Herta Muller." 
Greg's short stories and poems have been published in: Asymptote, The Guardian, Litro Magazine, Poetry Wales, Wasafiri, The White Review.

Her poetry book Finite Formulae & Theories of Chance has been shortlisted for the 2015 Griffin Poetry Prize. "Finite Formulae & Theories of Chance shortlisted for the Griffin Poetry Prize!"]. The judges said:
"These poems retain the force of first experience and, equally, a collection of history’s remains. Greg’s thoughts include the catastrophe of the 20th century whose marks still wobble before her eyes, and the experience of living in post-Communist Poland. This stunning collection shows us (mostly through the eyes and memories of childhood) a world of objects transported across years. ‘Tossing satin bulbs into wicker baskets,’ the child poet is at ease with the earth and the hardy objects made from it. Greg grants us the privilege of seeing what she saw before she saw more."

In 2012 an Arts Council-funded audio recording project of the British Library, Between Two Worlds: Poetry and Translation, recorded her poetry. Her poems have been translated into English, Italian, German, Catalan, Serbian, Spanish, and Welsh.

Books
Poetry
 Wyobraznia kontrolowana, Częstochowa, 1998
 Parantele, Częstochowa, 2003
 Orinoko, Tychy, 2008. 
 Inne obroty, Polish-Canadian Publishing Fund and Fraza, Toronto and Rzeszów, 2010, 
 Ruchy Browna, Częstochowa, 2011
 Smena's Memory. Collected Poems, London: Off_Press, 2011. 
 Finite Formulae and Theories of Chance, Arc Publications 2014,  (shortlisted for the 2015 Griffin Poetry Prize
 Czasy zespolone, Wydawnictwo Eperons-Ostrogi, Krakow 2017, 

Prose
 Notatnik z wyspy, Częstochowa, 2012. 
 Swallowing Mercury, Portobello Books, London 2017  (shortlisted for Man Booker International Prize, Jan Michalski Prize for Literature, The Warwick Prize for Women in Translation
 Accommodations, Transit Books  
 Dodatkowa dusza, Wydawnictwo Literackie, 
 Wilcza rzeka, Wydawnictwo W.A.B, 
Anthologies
 Scattering the Dark: An Anthology of Polish Women Poets, ed. Karen Kovacik, Buffalo, New York: White Pine Press, 2015.

Awards for books
 Longlisted for The Man Booker International Prize;
Swallowing Mercury (Portobello Books, translated by Eliza Marciniak); 
 Shortlisted for The National Translation Award, Swallowing Mercury, trans. by Eliza Marciniak; 
 Shorlisted for The Griffin Poetry Prize in Canada, Finite Formulae and Theories of Chance (Arc Publications, translated by Marek Kazmierski); 
 Shorlisted for The Warwick Prize for Women in Translation in the United
Kingdom, Swallowing Mercury;
 Shortlisted for The Michalski Prize in Switzerland, Swallowing Mercury;
 Shorlisted for The Nike Award in Poland, Guguły;
 Shorlisted for The Gdynia Award in Poland, Guguły;
 Shorlisted for The Prix Pierre-François Caillé in France, Les Fruits encore
verts (the Editions Intervalles, translated by Nathalie Le Marchand): 
 Award of the City Czestochowa in Poland in the fields of culture.

References

External links 
Profile in Culture.pl
Works on Emigrating Landscapes Project
Selected Poems in European Literature Night
Poem Thirteen, in a Gulag, 1950

1974 births
Living people
20th-century Polish poets
Polish women poets
Polish emigrants to the United Kingdom
People from Myszków County
21st-century Polish poets
20th-century Polish women writers
21st-century Polish women writers
Jan Długosz University alumni